Prelude and Fugue in C Minor, BWV 847, is a keyboard composition written by Johann Sebastian Bach. It is the second prelude and fugue in the first book of The Well-Tempered Clavier, a series of 48 preludes and fugues by the composer.

Analysis

Prelude
The prelude is 38 bars long, and consists mostly of a repeating motif. The motif consists of running sixteenth notes in the form of broken chords in both hands. Below are the first four bars of the prelude:

The prelude continues like so for 33 bars, with different harmony and changes of key. The coda begins at the 34th bar, where a sudden change of texture and tempo occurs. In the first bar of the coda, an arpeggiated chord is followed by a rapid succession of thirty-second notes. This new motif is repeated twice, after which a succession of sixteenth notes ends the prelude on a picardy third.

Fugue
The fugue is 31 bars long, and is written for 3 voices. Below is the two measure subject of the fugue, which starts in the middle voice:

Just like most fugues in the baroque period, the subject is then repeated in the top voice in the dominant key (G minor), and then repeated once more in the lowest voice, again in the home key. The fugue then continues with a development, and then another repetition of the subject in the home key. Just like the prelude, the fugue ends with a picardy third.

References
Bach, Johann Sebastian. "Prelude and Fugue No. 2 in C Minor." The Well Tempered Clavier, Books 1 and 2. Ed. Saul Novak.

External links

Prelude and Fugue No. 2 in C Minor Sheet Music (PDF)

The Well-Tempered Clavier
Compositions in C minor